List of towns in South Dakota, arranged in alphabetical order. This is a list of places incorporated in South Dakota as towns, regardless of size. Municipalities in South Dakota can also be incorporated as cities. South Dakota also has one incorporated village, Wentworth.

Towns in South Dakota have small populations, ranging from 3 up to 766 as of the 2010 Census. Cities are usually larger, but many places incorporated as cities also fall within this size range.

See: Howard South Dakota, List of townships in South Dakota.

Towns
Seven towns are county seats, and are designated with the † symbol and a green background in the table below.

References

Towns and villages
South Dakota, List of villages in